A Concert: Behind Prison Walls is the fifty-fourth overall album and a live album recorded by Johnny Cash at the Tennessee State Prison in 1974. The album features a total of seven performances by Cash with his backing band the Tennessee Three. It also features a total of nine performances by Linda Ronstadt, Roy Clark, and Foster Brooks.

The album is the soundtrack to a television special featuring the concert (Bill Turner, the same narrator from the broadcast, can be heard introducing acts on the album). It was not intended for release as a soundtrack album, but did eventually see release as such in 2003. It was released only 11 days after Cash's death and as such stands as his first posthumous release of previously unreleased performances, though it was not planned as such. A DVD of the broadcast was also released.

A Concert: Behind Prison Walls stands as the fourth and final album of Cash's conceptual series of live albums recorded before an audience of prison inmates. The other three are, chronologically, At Folsom Prison (1968), At San Quentin (1969) and På Österåker (1973).

The original release of the show was called Flowers Out of Place and featured Glen Sherley, who had written several songs that Cash had performed at earlier prison concerts. Sherley's material has been cut from recent releases of the show.

Track listing
Source: Allmusic

Personnel
Johnny Cash – vocals, acoustic guitar, harmonica
Linda Ronstadt – vocals
Roy Clark – vocals, guitar, banjo
Foster Brooks – vocals

The Tennessee Three
Larry McCoy – piano
Marshall Grant – bass
WS Holland – drums
Bob Wootton – electric guitar
Carl Perkins – electric guitar
Tommy Williams – fiddle

References

2003 live albums
Johnny Cash live albums
Prison music